In Greek mythology, Thelxinoë  (English translation: "mind charming") was a name attributed to four individuals.

Thelxinoë, one of the sirens. Also known as Thelxiope or Thelxiepia.
Thelxinoë, one of the four later recognized muses in Greek tradition. She and her sisters Aoede, Arche and Melete were regarded as daughters of Zeus by Plusia. She was linked with the charming of the mind as a Muse. The moon of Jupiter Thelxinoe is named after her. 
Thelxinoë, one of Semele's attendants.
Thelxinoëa, also Thelxionoea or Thelxineia, one of the so-called Praxidicae (the other two were Alacomenia and Aulis), daughters of King Ogyges of Boeotia.

Notes

References 

Greek legendary creatures
Mythological hybrids
Greek Muses
Greek goddesses
Children of Zeus

 Hesiod, Catalogue of Women from Homeric Hymns, Epic Cycle, Homerica translated by Evelyn-White, H G. Loeb Classical Library Volume 57. London: William Heinemann, 1914. Online version at theio.com

 Marcus Tullius Cicero, Nature of the Gods from the Treatises of M.T. Cicero translated by Charles Duke Yonge (1812-1891), Bohn edition of 1878. Online version at the Topos Text Project.
 Marcus Tullius Cicero, De Natura Deorum. O. Plasberg. Leipzig. Teubner. 1917.  Latin text available at the Perseus Digital Library.

 Nonnus of Panopolis, Dionysiaca translated by William Henry Denham Rouse (1863-1950), from the Loeb Classical Library, Cambridge, MA, Harvard University Press, 1940.  Online version at the Topos Text Project.
 Nonnus of Panopolis, Dionysiaca. 3 Vols. W.H.D. Rouse. Cambridge, MA., Harvard University Press; London, William Heinemann, Ltd. 1940-1942. Greek text available at the Perseus Digital Library.
Smith, William. (1870). Dictionary of Greek and Roman Biography and Mythology. London: Taylor, Walton, and Maberly.

Boeotian characters in Greek mythology
Sirens (mythology)